Streptanthus callistus is a rare species of flowering plant in the mustard family known by the common name Mount Hamilton jewelflower. It is endemic to Santa Clara County, California, where it is known from only about five occurrences around Mount Hamilton. It grows in chaparral and woodlands and on dry scree. It is an annual herb producing a small stem up to 8 or 9 centimeters tall with a bristly base. The toothed oval leaves are under 2 centimeters long. The inflorescence is a cluster-like raceme of flowers, the top ones sterile. The fertile flowers on the lower raceme have calyces of bristly purple-green sepals under a centimeter long with flaring purple petals at the tip. The sterile flowers at the top of the raceme have narrow, elongated, hairless purple sepals. The fruit is a cylindrical, bristle-studded silique measuring up to 2 or 2.5 centimeters long.

References

External links
Jepson Manual Treatment
Photo gallery

callistus
Natural history of Santa Clara County, California
Endemic flora of California
Endemic flora of the San Francisco Bay Area